M.K. 22 (Hebrew: מ.ק. 22 - Mem Qoph 22) is an Israeli animated sitcom, revolving around the adventures of soldiers in a fictional IDF military base hosting the so-called "Israeli doomsday weapon". The show was created for the cable channel Bip and debuted in March 2004, becoming the first prime time animated series in Israeli television,
and was later rebroadcast partly censored on Channel 2. The show won the Israeli Television Academy Award for Best Comedy Series
and is considered by many a milestone in the history of Israeli animation.
Despite gaining popularity and critical acclaim, the negotiations for a second season seem to have failed, making the first 10-episode season the only one thus far.

Main cast and characters
 Danny Steg as Corporal Shlomi Hanukkah: A narrow-minded soldier and a Mizrahi "ars".
 Haim Yafim Barbalat as Corporal Itai Shulman: Hanukkah's friend, an Ashkenazi nerd.
 Albert Iluz as Camp Commander Warrant Officer Gabriel Shukrun: A stupid, stubborn and manipulative NCO.
 Inbal Luri as Michal Levinstein: A handicapped volunteer, generally hated by all other involuntary soldiers for her self-righteousness.
 Adib Jahschan as Abed Abu Jamal: An Israeli Arab living near the base. He appears to be Shukrun's humble friend, while secretly being a terrorist training bionic shahid sheep. In the show he represents the "fifth column Israeli Arabs" stereotype.

Premise and production
M.K. 22 satirically deals with Israel Defense Forces manners and culture, and with general issues of Israeli society and current events in Israel. It is situated in the fictional top-secret logistics military base M.K. 22, in the south of Israel, storing the country's so-called nuclear missiles. Two of the show's creators, Yaron Niski and Doron Tzur, actually served together as logistics soldiers in an Israeli military base and the show is influenced by their experiences there.

The show's initial goal was "to combine the style of South Park with local cult such as Giv'at Halfon".
Director Assaf Harel claimed that the fact that the show was created for a cable network made it possible to use a blacker and more extreme type of humor, which he compared to that of South Park.
In general, South Park is widely considered the show's biggest influence by Israeli critics and fans. Obvious similarities to South Park include the crude style of animation, the use of live-action (the episode "One of Us" showed parts of the 1989 Israeli film of the same name, which the episode parodied), and a tongue-in-cheek disclaimer similar to that of South Park.

Name
M.K. stands for "machane keva", Hebrew for "permanent [military] camp", while the words "Mem Qoph 22" might sound like "milkud 22", the Hebrew translation for the idiom  catch-22.

Themes
The show's themes included, among others, the tensions between Haredi Jews and homosexuals, the media attention given to Ilan Ramon (prior to his death), the aliyah from Ethiopia, the West Bank barrier and the Split broadcast incident. The show also parodied several films, TV shows, politicians and celebrities.

Animation
According to Harel, the show's style of animation was influenced by South Park, although M.K. 22 uses more 3D computer graphics and more complicated backgrounds. The show's characters and backgrounds are made to appear deliberately crude, though not as if they're made of cut-out pieces of paper. There is only one round shape in the entire series, one of the soldiers' helmet, whereas other naturally round shapes look quadrilateral or polygonal. The Sun for instance, is a plain yellow square in the sky.

Controversy
In 2005, when it was decided to broadcast the show on Channel 2, the show's straightforward treatment of delicate Israeli issues caused Keshet to censor parts of it. One of the episodes, "Robo Rabbi", was completely censored. It has been suggested that the background for the episode's censorship was the upcoming expiration of the Channel 2 tender.
The episode parodied the threats of violence of Haredi Jews towards the pride parade, and spoofed the film Yossi & Jagger.

List of episodes
 "Heavy Water" (מים כבדים)
 "Sabbath at the Base" (שבת בבסיס)
 "The Good Fence" (הגדר הטובה)
 "Wolf, Wolf" (זאב זאב)
 "Time Travel" (בחזרה לעבר)
 "The Trial" (המשפט)
 "Robo Rabbi" (רובו רבי)
 "Yizkor" (יזכור)
 "Sex, Lies and Subarit" (סקס שקרים וסוברית)
 "One of Us" (אחת משלנו)

References

External links
 
 

2004 Israeli television series debuts
2004 Israeli television series endings
2000s adult animated television series
2000s black comedy television series
2000s Israeli television series
Israeli adult animated comedy television series
Animated satirical television series
Israeli television sitcoms
Israeli military television series
Military humor in film
Censorship in Israel